Angelo Weiss (born 9 February 1969) is an Italian alpine ski coach and former alpine skier who won a slalom race in FIS Alpine Ski World Cup.

Career
He competed in the 1994 Winter Olympics and 1998 Winter Olympics.

References

External links
 

1969 births
Living people
Italian male alpine skiers
Olympic alpine skiers of Italy
Alpine skiers at the 1994 Winter Olympics
Alpine skiers at the 1998 Winter Olympics
Italian people of Austrian descent
People from Trento
Alpine skiers of Fiamme Gialle
Sportspeople from Trentino
Italian alpine skiing coaches